The redstripe rasbora (Trigonopoma pauciperforata) is a small species of cyprinidfish found in freshwater in Southeast Asia.

References 

Fish of Thailand
Trigonopoma
Fish described in 1916
Taxa named by Lieven Ferdinand de Beaufort